Drift is a 2017 German drama film directed by Helena Wittmann. It was screened in the International Critics' Week section of the 74th Venice International Film Festival.

Cast
 Theresa George
 Josefina Gill

References

External links
 

2017 films
2017 drama films
German drama films
2010s German-language films
2010s German films